The Poke language (also called Puki, Tofoke, Topoke or Tovoke), is in the Soko–Kele languages group of Bantu languages. It is spoken by the Topoke people of the Tshopo District, Isangi Territory, in the Democratic Republic of the Congo.

References

Soko-Kele languages
Languages of the Democratic Republic of the Congo